Stade Vuillermet is a sports stadium in Lyon, Rhône-Alpes in France. The stadium was mostly used for rugby union by Lyon OU, until the club moved to Matmut Stadium in November 2011.

External links
 ( Stadiums page Vuillermet pop-up on Lyon.fr

8th arrondissement of Lyon
Sports venues in Lyon
Rugby union stadiums in France
Buildings and structures in Lyon
Sports venues completed in 1962